USS Sassacus may refer to the following ships of the United States Navy:

 , a wooden, double-ended sidewheel gunboat of the Sassacus class that served in the American Civil War
  was a harbor tug launched in 1942

United States Navy ship names